The Marcus Ashcroft Medal is awarded to the player judged best on ground in the QClash football match played between  Brisbane and Gold Coast.

It is named after former footballer Marcus Ashcroft, who played junior football on the Gold Coast for Surfers Paradise and Southport as well as 318 games for the Brisbane Bears/Lions between 1989 and 2003. He was both an integral member of Brisbane’s triple premiership team and the first Queenslander to play 300 AFL games. He is also a member of Queensland’s AFL Team of the Century.

Current Gold Coast captain Touk Miller and former Brisbane Lions' captain Dayne Beams have won the medal a record three times, whist Jarryd Lyons and Gary Ablett Jr have won the medal twice.

Winners

Multiple winners

See also

QClashes

References

External links

Brisbane Lions
Gold Coast Suns
Australian Football League awards
Australian rules football awards
Awards established in 2011